KJBZ (92.7 FM "Z-93") is a Regional Mexican format radio station that serves the Laredo, Texas, United States and Nuevo Laredo, Tamaulipas, Mexico border area.

History
KJBZ received its license in 1983 and had been assigned its calls two years earlier as KFIX.

External links
Z93Laredo Facebook

Regional Mexican radio stations in the United States
JBZ
JBZ
Radio stations established in 1983
1974 establishments in Texas